Okasha (Arabic: عكاشة) is an Egyptian surname that may refer to
Ahmed Okasha, Egyptian psychiatrist 
Motaz Okasha (born 1990), Egyptian basketball player
Osama Anwar Okasha (1941–2010), Egyptian screenwriter and journalist
Samir Okasha, Professor of Philosophy of Science at University of Bristol, UK
Tawfik Okasha, Egyptian television presenter 
Tharwat Okasha (born 1921), Egyptian writer, translator and government official

Arabic-language surnames